Pentarhopalopilia is a genus of plants in the family Opiliaceae described as a genus in 1987.

Pentarhopalopilia is native to Africa and Madagascar.

Species
 Pentarhopalopilia madagascariensis (Cavaco & Keraudren) Hiepko - Madagascar
 Pentarhopalopilia marquesii (Engl.) Hiepko - Cabinda, West Congo, East Congo, Zambia, Angola
 Pentarhopalopilia perrieri (Cavaco & Keraudren) Hiepko - Madagascar
 Pentarhopalopilia umbellulata (Baill.) Hiepko - Kenya, Tanzania, Mozambique

References

Opiliaceae
Santalales genera